The pea is most commonly the small spherical seed or the seed-pod of the flowering plant species Pisum sativum. Each pod contains several peas, which can be green or yellow. Botanically, pea pods are fruit, since they contain seeds and develop from the ovary of a (pea) flower. The name is also used to describe other edible seeds from the Fabaceae such as the pigeon pea (Cajanus cajan), the cowpea (Vigna unguiculata), and the seeds from several species of Lathyrus.

Peas are annual plants, with a life cycle of one year. They are a cool-season crop grown in many parts of the world; planting can take place from winter to early summer depending on location. The average pea weighs between 0.1 and 0.36 gram. The immature peas (and in snow peas the tender pod as well) are used as a vegetable, fresh, frozen or canned; varieties of the species typically called field peas are grown to produce dry peas like the split pea shelled from a matured pod. These are the basis of pease porridge and pea soup, staples of medieval cuisine; in Europe, consuming fresh immature green peas was an innovation of early modern cuisine.

Description
A pea is a most commonly green, occasionally golden yellow, or infrequently purple pod-shaped vegetable, widely grown as a cool-season vegetable crop. They do not thrive in the summer heat of warmer temperate and lowland tropical climates, but do grow well in cooler, high-altitude, tropical areas. Many cultivars reach maturity about 60 days after planting.

Peas have both low-growing and vining cultivars. A traditional approach to supporting climbing peas is to thrust branches pruned from trees or other woody plants upright into the soil, providing a lattice for the peas to climb. Branches used in this fashion are called pea sticks or sometimes pea brush. Metal fences, twine, or netting supported by a frame are used for the same purpose. In dense plantings, peas give each other some measure of mutual support. Pea plants can self-pollinate.

History

The wild pea is restricted to the Mediterranean Basin and the Near East. The earliest archaeological finds of peas date from the late Neolithic era of current Syria, Anatolia, Israel, Iraq, Jordan and Greece. In Egypt, early finds date from c. 4800–4400 BC in the Nile delta area, and from c. 3800–3600 BC in Upper Egypt. The pea was also present in Georgia in the 5th millennium BC. Farther east, the finds are younger. Peas were present in Afghanistan c. 2000 BC, in Harappan civilization around modern-day Pakistan and western- and northwestern India in 2250–1750 BC. In the second half of the 2nd millennium BC, this legume crop appears in the Ganges Basin and southern India.

In early times, peas were grown mostly for their dry seeds. From plants growing wild in the Mediterranean Basin, constant selection since the Neolithic dawn of agriculture improved their yield. In the early 3rd century BC, Theophrastus mentions peas among the legumes that are sown late in the winter because of their tenderness. In the first century AD, Columella mentions them in De re rustica, when Roman legionaries still gathered wild peas from the sandy soils of Numidia and Judea to supplement their rations.

In the Middle Ages, field peas are constantly mentioned, as they were the staple that kept famine at bay, as Charles the Good, count of Flanders, noted explicitly in 1124.

Green "garden" peas, eaten immature and fresh, were an innovative luxury of Early Modern Europe. In England, the distinction between field peas and garden peas dates from the early 17th century: John Gerard and John Parkinson both mention garden peas. Sugar peas, which the French called , because they were eaten pods and all, were introduced to France from the market gardens of Holland in the time of Henri IV, through the French ambassador. Green peas were introduced from Genoa to the court of Louis XIV of France in January 1660, with some staged fanfare. A hamper of them was presented before the King. They were shelled by the Savoyan comte de Soissons, who had married a niece of Cardinal Mazarin. Little dishes of peas were then presented to the King, the Queen, Cardinal Mazarin and Monsieur, the king's brother. Immediately established and grown for earliness warmed with manure and protected under glass, they were still a luxurious delicacy in 1696, when Mme de Maintenon and Mme de Sevigné each reported that they were "a fashion, a fury".

Modern split peas, with their indigestible skins rubbed off, are a development of the later 19th century.

The top producer of green peas – by far – is China with 12.2 million tons, followed by India (4.8 million tons), USA (0.31 million tons), France (0.23 million tons) and Egypt (0.15 million tons). United Kingdom, Pakistan, Algeria, Peru and Turkey complete the top 10.

Modern culinary use

In modern times peas are usually boiled or steamed, which breaks down the cell walls and makes the taste sweeter and the nutrients more bioavailable. Along with broad beans and lentils, these formed an important part of the diet of most people in the Middle East, North Africa and Europe during the Middle Ages. By the 17th and 18th centuries, it had become popular to eat peas "green", that is, while they are immature and right after they are picked. New cultivars of peas were developed by the English during this time, which became known as "garden" or "English" peas. The popularity of green peas spread to North America. Thomas Jefferson grew more than 30 cultivars of peas on his estate. With the invention of canning and freezing of foods, green peas became available year-round, and not just in the spring as before.

Fresh peas are often eaten boiled and flavored with butter and/or spearmint as a side dish vegetable. Salt and pepper are also commonly added to peas when served. Fresh peas are also used in pot pies, salads and casseroles. Pod peas (snow peas and snap peas) are used in stir-fried dishes, particularly those in American Chinese cuisine. Pea pods do not keep well once picked, and if not used quickly, are best preserved by drying, canning or freezing within a few hours of harvest.

In India, fresh peas are used in various dishes such as aloo matar (curried potatoes with peas) or mattar paneer (paneer cheese with peas), though they can be substituted with frozen peas as well. Peas are also eaten raw, as they are sweet when fresh off the bush. Green Peas known as Hasiru Batani in Kannada are used to make curry and Gasi. Split peas are also used to make dal, particularly in Guyana, and Trinidad, where there is a significant population of Indians.

Dried peas are often made into a soup or simply eaten on their own. In Japan, China, Taiwan and some Southeast Asian countries, including Thailand, the Philippines and Malaysia, peas are roasted and salted, and eaten as snacks. In the Philippines, peas, while still in their pods, are a common ingredient in viands and pansit. In the UK, dried yellow or green split peas are used to make pease pudding (or "pease porridge"), a traditional dish. In North America, a similarly traditional dish is split pea soup.

Pea soup is eaten in many other parts of the world, including northern Europe, parts of middle Europe, Russia, Iran, Iraq and India. In Sweden it is called ärtsoppa, and is eaten as a traditional Swedish food which predates the Viking Age. This food was made from a fast-growing pea that would mature in a short growing season. Ärtsoppa was especially popular among the poor, who traditionally only had one pot and everything was cooked together for a dinner using a tripod to hold the pot over the fire.

In Chinese cuisine, the tender new growth [leaves and stem] dou miao (豆苗; dòu miáo) are commonly used in stir-fries. Much like picking the leaves for tea, the farmers pick the tips off of the pea plant.

In Greece, Tunisia, Turkey, Cyprus, and other parts of the Mediterranean, peas are made into a stew with lamb and potatoes.

In Hungary and Serbia, pea soup is often served with dumplings and spiced with hot paprika.

In the United Kingdom, dried, rehydrated and mashed marrowfat peas, or cooked green split peas, known as mushy peas, are popular, originally in the north of England, but now ubiquitously, and especially as an accompaniment to fish and chips or meat pies, particularly in fish and chip shops. Sodium bicarbonate is sometimes added to soften the peas. In 2005, a poll of 2,000 people revealed the pea to be Britain's seventh favourite culinary vegetable.

Processed peas are mature peas which have been dried, soaked and then heat treated (processed) to prevent spoilage—in the same manner as pasteurizing. Cooked peas are sometimes sold dried and coated with wasabi, salt, or other spices.

In North America pea milk is produced and sold as an alternative to cow milk for a variety of reasons.

Pea sprouts 
In East Asia, the sprouts or shoots of pea  were once dedicated cuisine when the plant was not highly available as nowadays. But now, when the plant can be easily grown, fresh pea shoots are available in supermarkets, and some people decided to grow them in their backyard.

Manufacturing frozen peas
In order to freeze and preserve peas, they must first be grown, picked, and shelled. Usually, the more tender the peas are, the more likely that they will be used in the final product. The peas must be put through the process of freezing shortly after being picked so that they do not spoil too soon. Once the peas have been selected, they are placed in ice water and allowed to cool. After, they are sprayed with water to remove any residual dirt or dust that may remain on them. The next step is blanching. The peas are boiled for a few minutes to remove any enzymes that may shorten their shelf life. They are then cooled and removed from the water. The final step is the actual freezing to produce the final product. This step may vary considerably; some companies freeze their peas by air blast freezing, where the vegetables are put through a tunnel at high speeds and frozen by cold air. Finally, the peas are packaged and shipped out for retail sale.

Grading
Pea grading involves sorting peas by size, in which the smallest peas are graded as the highest quality for their tenderness. Brines may be used, in which peas are floated, from which their density can be determined.

Varieties

Garden peas 
There are many varieties (cultivars) of garden peas. Some of the most common varieties are listed here.  PMR indicates some degree of powdery mildew resistance; afila types, also called semi-leafless, have clusters of tendrils instead of leaves.  Unless otherwise noted these are so called dwarf varieties which grow to an average height of about 1m.  Giving the vines support is recommended, but not required.  Extra dwarf are suitable for container growing, reaching only about 25 cm.  Tall varieties grow to about 2m with support required.

 Alaska, 55 days (smooth seeded)
 Tom Thumb / Half Pint, 55 days (heirloom, extra dwarf)
 Thomas Laxton (heirloom) / Laxton's Progress / Progress #9, 60–65 days
 Mr. Big, 60 days, 2000 AAS winner
 Little Marvel, 63 days, 1934 AAS winner
 Early Perfection, 65 days
 Kelvedon Wonder, 65 days, 1997 RHS AGM winner
 Sabre, 65 days, PMR
 Homesteader / Lincoln, 67 days (heirloom, known as Greenfeast in Australia and New Zealand)
 Miragreen, 68 days (tall climber)
 Serge, 68 days, PMR, afila
 Wando, 68 days
 Green Arrow, 70 days
 Recruit, 70 days, PMR, afila
 Tall Telephone / Alderman, 75 days (heirloom, tall climber)

Sugar peas 
 Sugar peas or edible-pod peas ("eat-all pea"), lack the tough membrane inside the pod wall and have tender edible pods. There are two main types:

Snow peas have flat pods with thin pod walls. Pods and seeds are eaten when they are very young.
Snap peas or sugar snap peas have rounded pods with thick pod walls. Pods and seeds are eaten before maturity.

The name "sugar pea" includes both types, and therefore it can be synonymous with either snow peas or snap peas in different dictionaries.

Snow peas and snap peas both belong to Macrocarpon Group, a cultivar group based on the variety Pisum sativum var. macrocarpum Ser. named in 1825. It was described as having very compressed non-leathery edible pods in the original publication.

The scientific name Pisum sativum var. saccharatum Ser. is often misused for snow peas. The variety under this name was described as having sub-leathery and compressed-terete pods and a French name of petit pois. The description is inconsistent with the appearance of snow peas, and therefore botanists have replaced this name with Pisum sativum var. macrocarpum.

Field peas

The field pea is a type of pea sometimes called P. sativum subsp. arvense (L.) Asch.  It is also known as dun (grey-brown) pea, Kapucijner pea, or Austrian winter pea, and is one of the oldest domesticated crops, cultivated for at least 7,000 years.  Field peas are now grown in many countries for both human consumption and stockfeed.  There are several cultivars and colors including blue, dun (brown), maple and white. This pea should not be confused with the cowpea (Vigna unguiculata) which is sometimes called the "field pea" in warmer climates.

It is a climbing annual legume with weak, viny, and relatively succulent stems. Vines often are 4 to 5 feet (120 to 150 cm) long, but when grown alone, field pea's weak stems prevent it from growing more than 1.5 to 2 feet (45 to 60 cm) tall. Leaves have two leaflets and a tendril. Flowers are white, pink, or purple. Pods carry seeds that are large (4,000 seeds/lb), nearly spherical, and white, gray, green, or brown. The root system is relatively shallow and small, but well nodulated.

The field pea is a cool-season legume crop that is grown on over 25 million acres worldwide. It has been an important grain legume crop for millennia, seeds showing domesticated characteristics dating from at least 7000 years ago have been found in archaeological sites around what is now Turkey.  Field peas or "dry peas" are marketed as a dry, shelled product for either human or livestock food, unlike the garden pea, which is marketed as a fresh or canned vegetable. The major producing countries of field peas are Russia and China, followed by Canada, Europe, Australia and the United States. Europe, Australia, Canada and the United States raise over 4.5 million acres and are major exporters of peas. In 2002, there were approximately 300,000 acres of field peas grown in the United States.

Pests and diseases

A variety of diseases affect peas through a number of pathogens, including insects, viruses, bacteria and fungi. In particular, virus disease of peas has worldwide economic importance.

Additionally, insects such as the pea leaf weevil (Sitona lineatus) can damage peas and other pod fruits. The pea leaf weevil is native to Europe, but has spread to other places such as Alberta, Canada. They are about — long and are distinguishable by three light-coloured stripes running length-wise down the thorax. The weevil larvae feed on the root nodules of pea plants, which are essential to the plants' supply of nitrogen, and thus diminish leaf and stem growth. Adult weevils feed on the leaves and create a notched, "c-shaped" appearance on the outside of the leaves.

The Pea moth can be a serious pest producing caterpillars the resemble small white maggots in the pea-pods. The caterpillars eat the developing peas making them unsightly and unsuitable for culinary use. Prior to the use of modern insecticides, pea moth caterpillars were a very common sight in pea pods.

Peas in science

In the mid-19th century, Austrian monk Gregor Mendel's observations of pea pods led to the principles of Mendelian genetics, the foundation of modern genetics. He ended up growing and examining about 28,000 pea plants in the course of his experiments.

Mendel chose peas for his experiments because he could grow them easily, develop pure-bred strains, protect them from cross-pollination, and control their pollination. Mendel cross-bred tall and dwarf pea plants, green and yellow peas, purple and white flowers, wrinkled and smooth peas, and a few other traits. He then observed the resulting offspring. In each of these cases, one trait is dominant and all the offspring, or Filial-1 (abbreviated F1) generation, showed the dominant trait. Then he crossed members of the F1 generation together and observed their offspring, the Filial-2 (abbreviated F2)  generation. The F2 plants had the dominant trait in approximately a 3:1 ratio.

Mendel reasoned that each parent had a 'vote' in the appearance of the offspring, and the non-dominant, or recessive, trait appeared only when it was inherited from both parents. He did further experiments that showed each trait is separately inherited. Unwittingly, Mendel had solved a major problem with Charles Darwin's theory of evolution: how new traits were preserved and not blended back into the population, a question Darwin himself did not answer. Mendel's work was published in an obscure Austrian journal and was not rediscovered until about 1900.

Genome

The pea karyotype consists of seven chromosomes, five of which are acrocentric and two submetacentric. Despite its scientific popularity, its relatively large genome size (4.45Gb) made it challenging to sequence compared to other legumes such as Medicago truncatula and soybeans. The International Pea Genome Sequencing Consortium was formed to develop the first pea reference genome, and the draft assembly was officially announced in September 2019. It covers 88% of the genome (3.92Gb) and predicted 44,791 gene-coding sequences. The pea used for the assembly was the inbred French cultivar "Caméor".

Peas in medicine
Some people experience allergic reactions to peas, as well as lentils, with vicilin or convicilin as the usual allergens.

Favism, or Fava-bean-ism, is a genetic deficiency of the enzyme glucose-6-phosphate dehydrogenase that affects Jews, other Middle Eastern Semitic peoples and other descendants of the Mediterranean coastal regions. In this condition, the toxic reaction to eating most, if not all, beans is hemolytic anemia, and in severe cases the released circulating free hemoglobin causes acute kidney injury.

Nitrogen-fixing ability
Peas, like many legumes, contain symbiotic bacteria called Rhizobia within root nodules of their root systems. These bacteria have the special ability to fix nitrogen from atmospheric, molecular nitrogen into ammonia. The chemical reaction is:

Ammonia is then converted to another form, ammonium, usable by (some) plants by the following reaction:

The root nodules of peas and other legumes are sources of nitrogen that they can use to make amino acids, constituents of proteins. Hence, legumes are good sources of plant protein.

When a pea plant dies in the field, for example following the harvest, all of its remaining nitrogen, incorporated into amino acids inside the remaining plant parts, is released back into the soil. In the soil, the amino acids are converted to nitrate, that is available to other plants, thereby serving as fertilizer for future crops.

Etymology
The term pea originates from the Latin word pisum, which is the latinisation of the Greek πίσον (pison), neuter of πίσος (pisos) "pea". It was adopted into English as the noun pease (plural peasen), as in pease pudding. However, by analogy with other plurals ending in -s, speakers began construing pease as a plural and constructing the singular form by dropping the -s, giving the term pea. This process is known as back-formation.

Comparison

See also

 Black-eyed pea
 Black pea
 Chickpea
 Dixie lee pea
 Sweet pea
 Cowpea
 Pea moth

References

Bibliography
 European Association for Grain Legume Research (AEP). Pea. https://web.archive.org/web/20061017214408/http://www.grainlegumes.com/default.asp?id_biblio=52 .
 Hernández Bermejo, J. E. & León, J., (1992). Neglected crops: 1492 from a different perspective, Food and Agricultural Organization of the United Nations (FAO) Contents
 Muehlbauer, F. J. and Tullu, A., (1997). Pisum sativum L. Purdue University. Pea
 Oelke, E. A., Oplinger E. S., et al. (1991). Dry Field Pea. University of Wisconsin.Dry Field Pea

External links

 Sorting Pisum names
 USDA plant profile
 https://web.archive.org/web/20150303184216/http://www.nal.usda.gov/fnic/foodcomp/search/

Edible legumes
Fabeae
Fruit vegetables
Plants described in 1753
Plant models
Taxa named by Carl Linnaeus
Founder crops